Yakovlevsky District is the name of several administrative and municipal districts in Russia:
Yakovlevsky District, Belgorod Oblast, an administrative and municipal district of Belgorod Oblast
Yakovlevsky District, Primorsky Krai, an administrative and municipal district of Primorsky Krai

See also
Yakovlevsky (disambiguation)

References